This is a list of French television related events from 1967.

Events

Debuts
6 April - Les Dossiers de l'écran (1967-1991)
18 September - Monsieur Cinéma (1967-1980)
2 October - Colorix (1967-1973)

Television shows

1940s
Le Jour du Seigneur (1949–present)

1950s
Cinq colonnes à la une
Discorama
Magazine féminin (1952-1970)
Lectures pour tous (1953-1968)
La Piste aux étoiles (1956-1978)
Présence protestante (1955-)

1960s
Chambre noire 
Dim Dam Dom (1965-1971)
La Caméra invisible (1964-1971)
La Tête et les Jambes (1960-1978)
Les Coulisses de l'exploit (1961-1972)
  Télé-Philatélie
Voyage sans passeport (1957-1969)

Ending this year

Births
25 January - David Ginola, actor, TV presenter & former international footballer
18 March - Olivier Minne, Belgian-born producer, actor & TV presenter

Deaths

See also
1967 in France
List of French films of 1967

References